Greece have qualified for only four out of sixteen UEFA European Championships, but crowned themselves European champions in 2004. At Euro 2004 they beat hosts Portugal in the final, resulting in their first major tournament win.

Overall record

* Draws include knockout matches decided via penalty shoot-out.

Euro 1980

Group stage

Euro 2004

Group stage

Knockout stage

Quarter-finals

Semi-finals

Final

Euro 2008

Group stage

Euro 2012

Group stage

Knockout phase

Quarter-finals

Goalscorers

References

 
Countries at the UEFA European Championship